Yucca cernua E.L. Keith, common name "nodding Yucca," is a rare species in the family Asparagaceae known only from a small region in Newton and Jasper Counties in eastern Texas.

The epithet "cernua" and the common name "nodding yucca" both refer to the plant's nodding flowers, i.e. appearing to hang with the center pointing downward. The species often grows in disturbed habitats such as roadsides.

References

External links
Plant Delights Nursery at Juniper Level Botanic Garden, Yucca cernua (Nodding Texas Soapwort) 
Dave's Garden, PlantFiles: Weeping Yucca, Nodding Yucca Yucca cernua
J.C.Raulston Arboretum at North Carolina State University, Pic of the Day – Yucca cernua (MWTX11-565)
Almost Eden (Merryville Louisiana USA), Weeping Yucca, Nodding Yucca  Yucca cernua

cernua
Endemic flora of Texas
Plants described in 2003